Héctor André Cruz Cheng (born 18 January 1991 in Lima, Peru) is a Peruvian footballer who currently plays for Los Caimanes in the Peruvian Segunda División.

Club career
Héctor Cruz came from Sporting Cristal's youth divisions. On December 14, 2008, he debuted with Sporting Cristal in a match against Sport Boys.

References

External links

1991 births
Living people
Footballers from Lima
Peruvian footballers
Sporting Cristal footballers
León de Huánuco footballers
Sport Boys footballers
Peruvian Primera División players
Peruvian Segunda División players
Association football forwards